Over Alderley is a civil parish in Cheshire East, England. It contains 25 buildings that are recorded in the National Heritage List for England as designated listed buildings.  Of these, three are listed at Grade II*, the middle grade, and the others are at Grade II.  Other than the village of Ollerton, the parish is mainly rural.  Apart from a church and three parish boundary stones, the listed buildings are all houses, farmhouses, and associated structures.

Key

Buildings

References

Citations

Sources

 

Listed buildings in the Borough of Cheshire East
Lists of listed buildings in Cheshire